John Jasinski (born 1962) is the interim provost for Missouri State University and was the 10th university president of Northwest Missouri State University.

Early life
Jasinski was born in Flint, Michigan and was a 1980 graduate of Powers Catholic High School.

Education
He received a bachelor's degree from Central Michigan University in 1985 with a major in Broadcast and Cinematic Arts/Public Communication and Masters from Central in 1986 in Interpersonal and Public Communication.  He received a PhD from the University of Nebraska in 1996 in Educational Leadership and Higher Education Administration.

Northwest Missouri (1986–2001)
From 1986 to 2001 he served various capacities at Northwest including Associate Provost, Chair, Department of Mass Communication.  In 1994–95 he went on a Sabbatical to serve as Malcolm Baldrige National Quality Award Education Specialist.  He has served part-time with the organization since then.
Northwest has won more Missouri Quality Awards than any other organization (1997, 2001, 2005 & 2008)

Maryville City Council and Northwood University
From 2001 to 2007 he was a member of the Maryville, Missouri City Council.

From 2001 onward he operated a consulting service focusing particularly on Malcolm Baldrige coaching.

From 2007 until 2009 he was Executive Vice President, Chief Academic and Operating Officer at Northwood University.

References

1962 births
Living people
Presidents of Northwest Missouri State University
People from Flint, Michigan
People from Maryville, Missouri
Central Michigan University alumni
University of Nebraska alumni
American chief operating officers